Gobiocichla is a small genus of rheophilic cichlids native to the Cross (Manyu) and Niger Rivers in Africa.

Species
There are currently two recognized species in this genus:
 Gobiocichla ethelwynnae T. R. Roberts, 1982
 Gobiocichla wonderi Kanazawa, 1951

References
 
 http://www.cichlid-forum.com/articles/gobio_wonderi_pt1.php

Pseudocrenilabrinae
Cichlid genera